Caroline Clendening Laise (November 14, 1917 – July 25, 1991) was an American civil servant, ambassador to Nepal and the first female Assistant Secretary of State.

Early life and education
Born in Winchester, Virginia, to Elizabeth Frances (née Stevens) and James Frederic Laise. She received a Bachelor of Arts in public administration in 1938 from American University, where she was a member of the Gamma Delta chapter of Phi Mu fraternity. She later received a Master of Arts in political science from George Washington University in 1940.

Career 
Laise began her career in government as a coder for the Civil Service Commission in 1940. She had a position in the United Nations Relief and Rehabilitation Administration for a short time before joining the State Department in 1948. She was an adviser from 1956 to 1961, and in 1962 became deputy director of the Bureau of South Asian Affairs.

In 1965, Laise traveled to India and Pakistan as an adviser to Vice President Hubert Humphrey. After a year in New Delhi, President Lyndon B. Johnson named her ambassador to Nepal in 1966, a position she held until 1973.

In October 1973, she became Assistant Secretary of State for Public Affairs, and in 1974 became director general of the Foreign Service, until her retirement in 1977.

Personal life 
On January 3, 1967 she married 72-year-old ambassador-at-large Ellsworth Bunker in Kathmandu. Later that year, he was named ambassador to South Vietnam and for nearly the first six years of their marriage they only saw each other monthly, via a special government flight offered by President Johnson as enticement for Bunker to accept the post.

She died of cancer in Dummerston, Vermont at the age of 73.

References

Ambassadors of the United States to Nepal
United States Assistant Secretaries of State
1991 deaths
1917 births
American women ambassadors
American University alumni
George Washington University alumni
Directors General of the United States Foreign Service
20th-century American diplomats